Tenet is a 2020 science fiction spy film written and directed by Christopher Nolan, who also co-produced the film with Emma Thomas, under Syncopy Inc. A co-production between the United Kingdom and the United States, it stars John David Washington, Robert Pattinson, Elizabeth Debicki, Dimple Kapadia, Michael Caine, and Kenneth Branagh. The film follows a CIA agent who learns how to manipulate the flow of time to prevent an attack from the future that threatens to annihilate the present world.

Distributed by Warner Bros., Tenet was released in the United Kingdom on August 26, 2020 and in the United States on September 3, after being delayed three times because of the COVID-19 pandemic. It was the first Hollywood tent-pole to open in theaters after the pandemic shutdown, and grossed $363million worldwide, making it the fifth-highest-grossing film of 2020. The film received generally positive reviews from critics, who praised its ambition, direction, score, visual effects, action sequences, and Washington, Debicki and Pattinson's performances, but criticized its story, characters, and sound mixing.

Among its numerous awards and nominations, the film was nominated for Best Production Design and Best Visual Effects at the 93rd Academy Awards, winning the latter. It won the BAFTA Award for Best Special Visual Effects at the 74th British Academy Film Awards, and received nominations for five Critics' Choice Awards (winning one), a Golden Globe Award, five Satellite Awards (winning one), nine Saturn Awards (winning one), and one Hugo Award nomination.

Accolades

References

Sources

External links 
 

Lists of accolades by film